Matic Kotnik (born 23 July 1990) is a Slovenian professional footballer who plays as a goalkeeper for Greek Super League club Volos.

Club career

Panionios
On 11 June 2017, Kotnik moved abroad for the first time in his career, joining Panionios of the Super League Greece on a two-year contract.

International career
In August 2016, Kotnik was named in Slovenia's squad for a 2018 FIFA World Cup qualifier against Lithuania.

Career statistics

Club

References

External links
Player profile at Soccerway
Player profile at PrvaLiga 

1990 births
Living people
Sportspeople from Slovenj Gradec
Slovenian footballers
Association football goalkeepers
NK Dravograd players
NK Celje players
Panionios F.C. players
Brescia Calcio players
Volos N.F.C. players
Slovenian Second League players
Slovenian PrvaLiga players
Super League Greece players
Serie B players
Slovenian expatriate footballers
Slovenian expatriate sportspeople in Greece
Expatriate footballers in Greece
Slovenian expatriate sportspeople in Italy
Expatriate footballers in Italy
Slovenia youth international footballers